The 1939 German ultimatum to Poland refers to a list of 16 demands by Nazi Germany, which were published in August 1939 as a "peace proposal" and read out on German radio on August 31, 1939. It was announced that these points had been rejected by Poland, which was not true. Like the raid on the Gleiwitz radio station on the same day, the publication served to legitimize the invasion of Poland, which was already a done deal.

Background
On August 23, the Ribbentrop-Molotov Pact had been reached with the Soviet Union, dividing East-Central Europe into a German and a Soviet Sphere of influence in a secret additional protocol. This was the basis for the German attack on September 1. The Soviet invasion of eastern Poland followed on September 17.

On August 29, 1939, Adolf Hitler had told British Ambassador Nevile Henderson that he was ready to resume negotiations with Poland. For this purpose, a Polish plenipotentiary would have to come to Berlin within 24 hours.  In principle, Poland and Great Britain were ready to negotiate. Because of Hitler's ultimate demand, the British government decided not to forward it to Warsaw until after the set deadline had expired. On the night of August 31, Foreign Minister Joachim von Ribbentrop read the 16 points to Henderson but, against all diplomatic custom, refused to hand him the relevant document. Since no Polish representative had appeared, the proposal had become void anyway.  It was not until the following noon that the Polish Ambassador Józef Lipski appeared at the Foreign Office and sought an audience with Ribbentrop. Five hours later he was shown in, and since he did not have the negotiating authority demanded by Hitler, Ribbentrop briefly dismissed him with the information that he would inform the "Führer" of this. Thus the German-Polish relations were severed.

By the time of the radio broadcast on the same day, Hitler had already given the order to attack on September 1, 1939.

The sixteen points
 By reason of its purely German character and the unanimous will of its population, the Free City of Danzig shall be returned forthwith to the German Reich.
 The territory known as the Polish Corridor, that is to say, the territory bounded by the Baltic Sea and a line running from Marienwerder to Graudenz, Kulm, Bromberg, (including these towns), and then in a westerly direction towards Schönlanke, shall itself decide whether it shall become part of the German Reich or remain with Poland.
 For that purpose, a plebiscite shall be held in this territory. All Germans who were domiciled in this area on January 1, 1918, or who were born there on or before that day, and also all Poles, Cassubians, etc., who were domiciled in this area on that day or who were born there on or before the above-mentioned date, shall be entitled to vote. Germans who have been expelled from this territory shall return for the purpose of registering their votes.In order to ensure an impartial plebiscite and to guarantee that the necessary and extensive preparations for the plebiscite shall be carried out correctly, an International Commission like the one formed in connection with the Saar plebiscite, and consisting of members appointed by the four Great Powers, Italy, the U.S.S.R., France and Great Britain, shall be formed immediately, and placed in charge of this territory. This commission shall exercise sovereign rights throughout the territory. To that end, the territory shall be evacuated by the Polish military forces, by the Polish police and by the Polish authorities within the shortest possible time to be agreed upon.
  The Polish port of Gdynia to the extent of the Polish settlement is not included in this area, but, as a matter of principle, is recognized as Polish territory.The details of the boundaries of this Polish port shall be decided on by Germany and Poland, and if necessary established by an International Court of Arbitration.
 In order to allow for ample time for the necessary and extensive preparations for the carrying out of an impartial plesbiscite, this plebiscite shall not take place before a period of twelve months has elapsed.
 In order that during that period, Germany’s lines of communication with East Prussia and Poland’s access to the sea may be unrestrict-edly ensured, certain roads and railway lines shall be determined, in order to facilitate unobstructed transit. In this connection only such taxes may be levied as are necessary for the upkeep of the lines of communication and for the carrying out of transport.
 The allocation of this territory shall be decided on by the absolute majority of the votes cast.
 In order to secure, after the plebiscite (irrespective of the result thereof), Germany’s unrestricted communication with the province of Danzig-East Prussia, and Poland’s access to the sea, Germany shall, in case the territory be returned to Poland as a result of the plebiscite, be given an extraterritorial traffic zone running from, say, Bütow to Danzig or Dirschau, for the purpose of building a German motor highway (Reichsautobahn) and also a four-track railway line. The construction of the motor road and of the railway shall be carried out in such a manner that Polish lines of communication are not affected thereby, i.e., they are to be overbridged or underbridged. This zone shall be one kilometer in width and shall be German territory.Should the result of the plebiscite be in favor of Germany, Poland shall have the same rights as Germany would have had, to build an extraterritorial road and railway connection in order to secure her free and unrestricted access to her port of Gdynia.
 In the event of the Polish Corridor being returned to the Reich, the latter declares herself prepared to arrange with Poland for an exchange of population, insofar as conditions in the Corridor lend themselves to such an exchange.
 Any special rights claimed by Poland within the port of Danzig shall be negotiated on a parity basis in exchange for equal rights for Germany at the Port of Gdynia.
 In order to avoid any sense of menace or danger on either side, Danzig and Gdynia shall henceforth have a purely commercial character; i.e., neither of these places shall be provided with means of military defense or fortifications.
 The Peninsula of Hela, which according to the result of the plebiscite would be allocated either to Poland or to Germany, shall also be demilitarized in any case.
 The German Government, having most serious complaints to make about the treatment of the minority by the Poles, and the Polish Government, considering themselves entitled to raise complaints against Germany, agree to investigate into all complaints about economic and personal damage, as well as other acts of terrorism.Germany and Poland bind themselves to indemnify the minorities on either side for any economic damages and other wrongs inflicted upon them since 1918; and/or to revoke all expropriations or otherwise to completely indemnify the respective person or persons for these and other encroachments upon economic life.
 In order to free the Germans remaining in Poland, as well as the Poles remaining in Germany, from the feeling of being deprived of the benefits of international law, and above all to afford them the certainty of their not being made to take part in actions and in furnishing services of a kind not compatible with their national convictions, Germany and Poland mutually agree to safeguard the rights of their respective minorities by most comprehensive and binding agreements for the purpose of warranting these minorities the preservation, free development and cultivation of their national customs, habits and traditions, to grant them in particular and for that purpose the form of organization considered necessary by them. Both parties undertake not to draft the members of the minority into military service.
 In case of an agreement being reached on the basis of these proposals, Germany and Poland declare themselves prepared immediately to order and carry out the demobilization of their respective armed forces.
 Any additional measures required to hasten the carrying through of the above agreement shall be mutually agreed upon between Germany and Poland.

Commentary

In 1959, the historian Karl Dietrich Erdmann expressed the view that Poland had refused "to show any objective accommodation in the questions that had to be settled since the unfortunate provisions of the Treaty of Versailles". In doing so, it had weakened its own "moral position" in the face of German "impositions against Polish integrity and independence." In contrast, Klaus Hildebrand points out that the German offer of negotiations was only made as an alibi to its own population. Its decision to go to war had been made long ago. According to Hermann Graml, the 16 points were not intended as a basis for negotiations at all, but to let them "burst." Peter Longerich also emphasizes the "purely propagandistic character" of the 16-point memorandum, since the Germans gave neither the Polish nor the British side the opportunity to comment on it before they began their invasion.

References

 
1939 in Poland
1939 in Germany
Germany–Poland relations
August 1939 events
1939 in international relations
Ultimata
Diplomatic incidents
1939 documents
Foreign relations of Nazi Germany